Eva Hegener (born 24 June 1961, in Cologne) is a German former field hockey player who competed in the 1988 Summer Olympics.

References

External links
 

1961 births
Living people
German female field hockey players
Olympic field hockey players of West Germany
Field hockey players at the 1988 Summer Olympics
Sportspeople from Cologne
20th-century German women
21st-century German women